Theodor Heinrich Mayer (27 February 1884 – 3 November 1949) was an Austrian writer and chemist. His work was part of the art competitions at the 1928 Summer Olympics and the 1936 Summer Olympics.

Works
Novels, unless indicated otherwise
 Von Menschen und Maschinen (1915)
 Typhus (1920)
 Wir (drama, 1921)
 Prokop der Schneider (1922)
 Rapanui – Der Untergang einer Welt (1923)
 Cyprian der Abenteurer (1924)
 Die Macht der Dinge (short stories, 1924)
 David findet Abissag (1925)
 Der große Stiefel (1926)
 Die letzten Bürger (1927)
 Die Bahn über den Berg (1928)
 Minister Bruck: Das Buch vom Anschluß Österreichs, wie er vor siebzig Jahren hätte sein können und auch heute noch sein kann (1929)
 Tod über der Welt (1930)
 Königgrätz (1931)
 Clown der Welt: Ein Film-Roman (1931)
 Deutscher im Osten (1932)
 Geld ... Geld! (1935)
 Ärzte (1936)
 Der Adjutant des Prinzen (1937)
 Sudeten (1938)
 Vom Gedanken zur Tat. Novellen aus der Geschichte werktätigen Schaffens (novellas) (1941)
 Menschenland (1947)
 Im ewigen Eis (1949)

References

Further reading
 V. Hanus: Mayer Theodor Heinrich. In: Österreichisches Biographisches Lexikon 1815–1950 (ÖBL). Band 6, Verlag der Österreichischen Akademie der Wissenschaften, Wien 1975, S. 2
 Nessun Saprà: Lexikon der deutschen Science Fiction & Fantasy 1870-1918. Utopica, Oberhaid 2005, p. 183

External links
 

1884 births
1949 deaths
20th-century Austrian male writers
Olympic competitors in art competitions
Writers from Vienna